Interstellar Discussion is the ninth album by Jandek, and his only release of 1984. It was released as Corwood 0747. It was reissued on CD in 2001.

Track listing

Album cover description
Objects on the cover were also used on previous album covers. The drum set is from The Rocks Crumble, minus the snare. The writing desk is from Your Turn to Fall. The drum throne is a naugahyde chair.

External links
Seth Tisue's Interstellar Discussion review

Jandek albums
Corwood Industries albums
1984 albums